"A Rolling Stone" is a 1980 single by Jamaican singer Grace Jones.

Background
The song was recorded for Jones' 1980 album Warm Leatherette, her first post-disco album, and was released as the first single from the album in the UK. It did not garner much attention and was quickly followed by "Love Is the Drug" and "Private Life". Unlike the majority of the material on Warm Leatherette, the song was not a cover version but a new composition co-written by Jones herself, Deniece Williams and Fritz Baskett. In the lyrics Jones complains to her lover about something missing in their relationship, which is affection. The 7" single featured an edited version of "Sinning", the opening track from the previous disco album Muse as the B-side. The 12" single included an extended remix of "A Rolling Stone", which was only released in the UK and remained unreleased on CD until it was included on the 2016 Remastered edition of Warm Leatherette.

Track listing
7" single
A. "A Rolling Stone" – 3:31
B. "Sinning" – 4:08

12" single
A. "A Rolling Stone" – 5:39
B. "Sinning" – 5:05

References

1980 singles
Grace Jones songs
Songs written by Grace Jones
1980 songs
Island Records singles
Song recordings produced by Alex Sadkin